Ethmia turkmeniella is a moth in the family Depressariidae. It is found in Turkmenistan and Kalmykia, Russia.

References

Moths described in 1998
turkmeniella